The 2021 Categoría Primera B season (officially known as the 2021 Torneo BetPlay DIMAYOR season for sponsorship reasons) was the 32nd season of the Categoría Primera B since its founding as Colombia's second division football league. The tournament started on 15 January 2021 and ended on 10 March 2022. Atlético Huila were the defending champions, having been unable to earn promotion to the Categoría Primera A despite winning the previous tournament.

Deportes Quindío won their second Primera B title in the Torneo I, defeating Cortuluá in the final over two legs, whilst Unión Magdalena were the champions in the Torneo II, beating Cortuluá in the final on penalties after a 1–1 draw to claim their first title.

Format
The format for the 2021 Primera B season was decided at DIMAYOR's General Assembly session of 17 December 2020.
For this season, two tournaments (Torneo I and Torneo II) with three stages each will be played. In the Torneo I, the 16 teams played a single round-robin tournament under the same fixture as the previous season, but with reversed home-and-away order. The top eight teams at the end of the fifteen rounds advanced to the semi-finals, where teams were split into two groups of four where they played each one of their rivals twice. The top team of each group advanced to the finals, where they played a double-legged series with the winner advancing to the Grand Final against the 2020 Primera B winners Atlético Huila. The Grand Final was also played over two legs, with the winner earning promotion to the Primera A for the 2021 Finalización tournament. The second promotion spot to the 2021 Primera A season would be decided in a promotion play-off between the Grand Final loser and the best team of the aggregate table of both the 2020 and 2021–I tournaments, other than the Grand Final winners.

The Torneo II was only played by 15 teams, given that two teams were promoted and only one team was relegated from the Primera A. In the first stage, the 15 teams played a single round-robin tournament with the top eight teams advancing to the semi-finals, in which the eight qualified teams were split into two groups of four teams each, playing a double round-robin tournament. Both group winners were promoted to the Primera A for the 2022 season and also played a single-match final to decide the champions.

Teams
17 teams took part in the season, the 16 teams that competed in the previous season as well as Boyacá Chicó, who were relegated from the Primera A at the end of the 2021 Apertura tournament. Real San Andrés were rebranded back to Real Santander and returned to the Santander Department following the expiration of the agreement with the local authorities of the Archipelago of San Andrés, Providencia and Santa Catalina.

The following team was relegated from the Categoría Primera A at the end of the 2021 Apertura tournament and took part in the Torneo II:

Torneo I

First stage

Standings

Results

Semi-finals
The eight teams that advanced to the semi-finals were drawn into two groups of four teams, with the top two teams from the first stage being seeded in each group. The winners of each group advanced to the finals.

Group A

Group B

Finals

Deportes Quindío won 2–0 on aggregate.

Top scorers

Source: Soccerway

Grand Final
The Torneo I winners Deportes Quindío played a double-legged series against the 2020 Primera B champions Atlético Huila for the first promotion berth to the Categoría Primera A for the remainder of the 2021 season. The losing team qualified for the promotion play-off.

Atlético Huila won 3–1 on aggregate and were promoted to Categoría Primera A.

2020 and 2021–I aggregate table

Promotion play-off
Since the Grand Final losers Deportes Quindío also ended up as the best team in the 2020 and 2021–I aggregate table, they earned automatic promotion to the Categoría Primera A and the promotion play-off was not played.

Torneo II

First stage

Standings

Results

Semi-finals
The eight teams that advanced to the semi-finals were drawn into two groups of four teams, with the top two teams from the first stage being seeded in each group. The winners of each group advanced to the final and were also promoted to Categoría Primera A for 2022.

Group A

Group B

Final

Top scorers
{| class="wikitable" border="1"
|-
! Rank
! Name
! Club
! Goals
|-
| align=center | 1
| Luis Felipe Gómez
|Leones
| align=center | 12
|-
| align=center | 2
| Diego Echeverri
|Llaneros
| align=center | 11
|-
| rowspan=2 align=center | 3
| Carlos Lucumí
|Fortaleza
| rowspan=2 align=center | 10
|-
| Jefferson Rivas
|Leones
|-
| align=center | 5
| Ethan González
|Unión Magdalena
| align=center | 8
|-
| rowspan=3 align=center | 6
| Isaac Camargo
|Unión Magdalena
| rowspan=3 align=center | 7
|-
| Iván Rivas
|Boyacá Chicó
|-
| Luis Sandoval
|Fortaleza
|-
| rowspan=3 align=center | 9
| Guillermo Murillo
|Cortuluá
| rowspan=3 align=center | 6
|-
| Franklin Navarro
|Real Cartagena
|-
| Franco Pedraza
|Bogotá
|}

Source: Soccerway

Llaneros v Unión Magdalena controversy
On 4 December 2021, the last matchday of the Torneo II semi-final Group B, Unión Magdalena sealed their promotion to Categoría Primera A after coming back from a 1–0 deficit against Llaneros in Villavicencio with a couple of goals in quick succession in stoppage time to win the game by a 2–1 score and get promoted at the expense of Fortaleza, who were clinching promotion with the score in Villavicencio despite losing their final match to Bogotá at the same time. However, video footage of Unión Magdalena's winning goal appeared to show the Llaneros players backing off and failing to make an effort to prevent their rivals from scoring. The events sparked outrage both within the country and abroad, with Colombian internationals Juan Cuadrado and Mateus Uribe expressing their displeasure, calling them "a lack of respect" and "an embarrassment for Colombian football", whilst President of Colombia Iván Duque Márquez stated it was a "national disgrace".

In response to the growing backlash, as well as calls from Fortaleza to get the match annulled and Unión Magdalena's promotion reversed, DIMAYOR chairman Fernando Jaramillo ordered the opening of an inquiry on the match events while also requesting the Office of the Attorney General of Colombia to investigate whether any criminal offenses had been committed, but on 7 December 2021, Jaramillo stated that the tournament would not be paused and Unión Magdalena's promotion would not be overturned while due process was completed. However, amid the ongoing inquiries, the Torneo II's final match between Cortuluá and Unión Magdalena, which was originally scheduled to be played on 11 December 2021 at Cortuluá's home stadium Estadio Doce de Octubre was postponed until further notice.

On 30 December 2021 DIMAYOR's Disciplinary Commission closed the investigation on Unión Magdalena as it found no evidence implying that members of the aforementioned club had been responsible for the events that occurred in the match against Llaneros, thus confirming their promotion to Primera A. However, sources within the governing body of Colombian professional football stated that the investigation on Llaneros would remain open. Five months later, it was announced that four Llaneros players who were involved in that match had been fined and suspended from all sporting and administrative activities for "committing acts against sporting dignity and decorum".

See also
 2021 Categoría Primera A season
 2021 Copa Colombia

References

External links 
  

Categoría Primera B seasons
2
Colombia